Linkous Store is a settlement near the town of Blacksburg in Montgomery County, Virginia, United States. The community is a part of the Blacksburg–Christiansburg Metropolitan Statistical Area which encompasses all of Montgomery County and the cities of Blacksburg, Christiansburg, and Radford for statistical purposes.

The settlement is named for a store (not extant) originally constructed in the mid 19th century and owned by the Linkous family.  The town had a one-room school, Matamoras No. 9, located behind the site of St. Peter's Lutheran Church.  A marker at the site of the church reads in part "Site of St. Peter's Evangelical Church, 1750-1885. St. Peter's was the first Church west of the Alleghanies and the third Lutheran Church in Virginia."

References

External links
Map of Montgomery County showing Linkous Store. Commonwealth of Virginia Department of Highways. Richmond, VA: June 1, 1932. Revised July 1, 1936. Library of Virginia Digital Collections.

Unincorporated communities in Montgomery County, Virginia
Unincorporated communities in Virginia
Blacksburg–Christiansburg metropolitan area